The Hosokawa Cabinet governed Japan from August 9, 1993, to April 28, 1994, under the leadership of Prime Minister Morihiro Hosokawa. In Japan, the Hosokawa Cabinet is generally referred to as a representative example of non-LDP and non-JCP Coalition.

Political background
Formed in the aftermath of the 1993 general election, this cabinet was a broad based coalition of parties of both left (the JSP and DSP), right (JRP, JNP and NPS) and religious politics (Komeito). A series of defections had cost the LDP its majority before the 1993 election, after which all non-Communist opposition parties coalesced with the aim of creating the first non-LDP government in 38 years and achieving electoral reform. Despite the fact that the conservative Japan Renewal Party and the left-wing Japan Socialist Party were the largest parties in the coalition, Ichirō Ozawa (who negotiated the formation of the government) and his allies in the JRP pushed for Morihiro Hosokawa, a former governor of Kumamoto Prefecture and the leader of the small Japan New Party, to lead the government. Hosokawa was elected by the Diet on August 6, and took office as the first non-LDP Prime Minister for four decades. The Prime Minister himself was the only New Party member of the cabinet, which was mostly dominated by the JRP and the Socialists.

The coalition achieved Hosokawa's goal of electoral reform, replacing the previous system of multi-member districts with a combined system of single-member districts, elected by first past the post, and blocs of proportional representation candidates. But having achieved this, and replaced the LDP, the unifying purpose of the coalition was lost and ideological differences between the parties, especially over tax and defence policy, began to split the cabinet. Following revelations of a campaign finance scandal, Hosokawa announced his surprise resignation on April 8, 1994. After several weeks of negotiations, foreign minister Tsutomu Hata of the JRP became Prime Minister on April 28.

Election of the Prime Minister

Ministers 

R = Member of the House of Representatives
C = Member of the House of Councillors

Changes 

 December 1 – Defence Minister Keisuke Nakanishi resigned over controversial remarks he made related to Japan's pacifist constitution, and was replaced by Kazuo Aichi.

References

External links 
 List of Ministers at the Kantei: Hosokawa Cabinet 

Cabinet of Japan
1993 establishments in Japan
1994 disestablishments in Japan
Cabinets established in 1993
Cabinets disestablished in 1994